Robert Paul Saverine (born June 2, 1941) is a former Major League Baseball infielder/outfielder.  He was signed by the Baltimore Orioles as an amateur free agent before the 1959 season and played for the Orioles (1959, 1962–1964) and the Washington Senators (1966–1967).

Biography
Saverine was number one in his high school class at Darien High School and was recruited by scouts for both professional baseball and basketball. His father Joseph Saverine is the only person in Georgetown University's history to have captained both the baseball and football athletic teams in a single year.

Saverine made his Major League debut on September 12, 1959 against the Chicago White Sox at Memorial Stadium.  He entered the game as a pinch runner in the bottom of the eighth inning for Billy Klaus with the Orioles behind 6-0.  He advanced to third on a single to right by Al Pilarcik, then scored on a Bob Nieman single to left.  Baltimore lost the game 6-1 to future Hall of Famer Early Wynn.  At the age of 18, Saverine was the youngest player to appear in an American League game that season.

Saverine scored the only run in a rare battle of complete game one-hitters between Orioles left-hander Frank Bertaina and Kansas City Athletics southpaw Bob Meyer.  On September 12, 1964 he entered the 0-0 game in the bottom of the 8th as a pinch runner for John Orsino, who had doubled.  He moved to third on a Bertaina sacrifice bunt and then scored on a sacrifice fly by Jackie Brandt.

In 1966 he was put in the starting lineup 96 times by Senators manager Gil Hodges, usually as a second baseman.  He also had career highs in games played (120), hits (102), at bats (406), batting average (.251), home runs (5), runs batted in (24), and runs scored (54).

Career totals for 379 games include a .239 batting average (206-for-861), 6 HR, 47 RBI, 114 runs scored, and an on-base percentage of .299.  Besides second base, Saverine also played shortstop, third base, and all three outfield positions.  He played all the positions well, but was especially good at short, where he handled 146 out of 148 total chances for a fielding percentage of .986.

References

External links

Retrosheet
Bob Saverine - Baseballbiography.com

1941 births
Living people
Baltimore Orioles players
Baseball players from Connecticut
Bluefield Orioles players
Buffalo Bisons (minor league) players
Fox Cities Foxes players
Little Rock Travelers players
Major League Baseball infielders
Major League Baseball outfielders
Rochester Red Wings players
Sportspeople from Norwalk, Connecticut
Washington Senators (1961–1971) players